Black Jazz Signature is a compilation album by American artist Theo Parrish. It was released through Snow Dog Records in 2013. The album features tracks from the 1970s record label Black Jazz Records.

Critical reception
At Metacritic, which assigns a weighted average score out of 100 to reviews from mainstream critics, the album received an average score of 84% based on 5 reviews, indicating "universal acclaim".

Steve Shaw of Fact gave the album a 4.5 out of 5, saying, "Black Jazz Signature captures a sheer flood of music, parts crashing and reforming around each other as they break away, jut out, drop back, or lace themselves around others." Michael Harkin of XLR8R gave the album an 8 out of 10, saying, "the mix has the feeling of a continuous, subtly shifting jam that continually stirs and stimulates, much like Parrish's sets behind the decks."

Resident Advisor placed it at number 5 on their list of the top 10 official mixes of 2013.

Track listing

References

External links
 
 

2013 compilation albums
Jazz compilation albums